Spirit of Mingusis a live album by soprano saxophonist Steve Lacy and pianist Eric Watson, which was recorded in Paris in 1991 and first released on the Free Lance label in 1992.

Reception

The Allmusic review by Ken Dryden stated "pianist Eric Watson is a more-than-capable foil for Lacy's adventurous excursions into the works of Charles Mingus ... fans of Steve Lacy are advised to pick up this outstanding release quickly".

Track listing
All compositions by Charles Mingus
 "Peggy's Blue Skylight" – 6:47
 "Self Portrait in Three Colors" – 8:48
 "Nostalgia in Times Square" – 5:25
 "I X Love" – 7:53
 "Reincarnation of a Lovebird" – 9:12
 "Pithycanthropus Erectus" – 6:41
 "Free Cell, Block F..." – 7:03
 "Goodbye Pork Pie Hat" – 5:23
 "Remember Rockefeller at Attica" – 6:18

Personnel
Steve Lacy – soprano saxophone
Eric Watson – piano

References

Steve Lacy (saxophonist) live albums
1992 live albums